Sipho Mandla Agmatir Thwala (born 1968) is a South African rapist and serial killer who was convicted in 1999 for the murders of 16 women and 10 rapes. He was sentenced to 506 years in prison. Thwala was known by the moniker "The Phoenix Strangler".

Thwala, born and raised in KwaMashu, began his year-long rape and murder spree in 1996 in South Africa's KwaZulu-Natal province. His modus operandi was to lure local women into accompanying him through the sugarcane fields of Mount Edgecombe near the town of Phoenix with the promise of employment as domestic workers in nearby hotels. Once they were deep within the cane fields, Thwala would attack the women, bind them with their own undergarments and then rape, strangle and bludgeon them to death. He relied on physical evidence of his attacks being destroyed through the common farming practice of burning cane fields, which set the police investigation back until a body was eventually discovered that had not yet been burned.

Thwala was arrested in 1997 after South African police matched DNA found on the victims to DNA taken from Thwala in 1994 when he was arrested and acquitted of a rape. On 31 March 1999, the High Court in Durban found Thwala guilty of 16 murders and 10 rapes and sentenced him to 506 years in prison.

Thwala is currently being held at C Max Penitentiary in Pretoria, South Africa.

See also
List of serial killers by country

References

Further reading
 

1968 births
Living people
Male serial killers
People convicted of murder by South Africa
People from KwaMashu
South African arsonists
South African people convicted of murder
South African people convicted of rape
South African serial killers
Violence against women in South Africa